The William H. Lightle House is a historic house at 601 East Race Street in Searcy, Arkansas.  It is a roughly L-shaped -story wood-frame structure, with a gabled roof, weatherboard siding, and brick foundation.  It has vernacular Italianate styling, with tall and narrow segmented-arch windows, and a shed-roof porch supported by square posts set on pedestal bases.  The house was built in 1881 for a prominent local businessman, and is one of the county's few Italianate residences.

The house was listed on the National Register of Historic Places in 1991.

See also
Ben Lightle House (301 East Market Avenue, Searcy, Arkansas)
Lightle House (107 North Elm Street, Searcy, Arkansas)
Lightle House (605 Race Avenue, Searcy, Arkansas)
Lightle House (County Road 76, Searcy, Arkansas)
National Register of Historic Places listings in White County, Arkansas

References

Houses on the National Register of Historic Places in Arkansas
Italianate architecture in Arkansas
Houses completed in 1881
Houses in Searcy, Arkansas
National Register of Historic Places in Searcy, Arkansas
1881 establishments in Arkansas